Kongsberg Church is a building and congregation of the Church of Norway located at Kongsberg in Viken county, Norway.

Kongsberg Church, a large baroque church, was designed by Joachim Andreas Stukenbrock and the construction period lasted from 1740 to 1761. It has a simple exterior with a richly decorated rococo interior. Kongsberg Church was constructed of brick and designed with a cruciform floor plan.  The design of the church was inspired by Garnisons Church in Copenhagen.

Virtually all fixtures in the church are of wood, but pillars and surfaces have been marbled. The whole church has a cool blue color as a result. On either side of the altar and pulpit are the pillars that bear the organ gallery above. The Baroque organ is from 1765 and  made by organ builder Gottfried Heinrich Gloger. In the 1850s it was restored by Paul Brantzeg and in 1932 by Josef Hilmar Jørgensen. In 1928, Tinius Olsen gave a major donation to the restoration of the organ which had suffered water damage in the late 1880s. The baptismal font was carved out of marble  extracted from Holmestrand in Vestfold. The chandeliers were produced at Nøstetangen glassverk in Hokksund during  the second half of the 1700s.

The sanctuary includes ceiling decorations by Eric Gustav Tunmarck. Among the driving forces behind the decoration and interior of the church was mining engineer Michael Heltzen.

Kongsberg Church Interior

References

External links

Kongsberg kirke website

Churches in Viken
Churches completed in 1761
1761 in Norway
Cruciform churches in Norway
18th-century Church of Norway church buildings